Matthias "Matt" Zemlin (born December 11, 1980) is a German manager, cyber security and online expert, former film distributor, producer, director and actor.

During the last years Matthias Zemlin was sales director at Mediflow where he was involved in the significant increase of Mediflow’s brand awareness and successfully managed the retail and medical supply sales in Germany and Austria.

Before, in 2012 and 2013, Zemlin was known as one of the key players in senior sales management within in the entertainment and games industry in Germany as well as in Mumbai, because of his distribution of several Bollywood blockbusters. Notable director and producer credits included the European production Dirty Money (2013) and Bollywood productions such as Wanted (2009), Aakrosh (2010), Dabangg (2010) and Rockstar (2011) that have been released internationally Zemlin repeatedly appeared in German TV shows like Einsatz in Hamburg and had film roles in international productions such as Brain Dead (2007), 
The Sky Has Fallen (2009), Henri 4 (2010),
King of the Underground (2011) and Closer Than Love (2013).

References

External links

Footage Network - Matt Zemlin

Living people
German corporate directors
Film people from Hamburg
German male television actors
German male film actors
1980 births